Sefid Kuh may refer to:

Sefid Kuh, Hormozgan, a village in Hormozgan Province, Iran
Sefid Kuh, Mazandaran, a village in Mazandaran Province, Iran
Sefid Kuh, Yazd, a village in Yazd Province, Iran
Sefid Kooh, a mountain in the Kermanshah province, Iran

See also
Safēd Kōh (disambiguation)
Kuh Sefid (disambiguation)